Jeannie Tirado is an American voice actress. Some of her noteworthy roles include Zera in Fairy Tail Zero, Leila Malcal in Code Geass: Akito the Exiled, Kaga in KanColle: Kantai Collection, Android 21 in Dragon Ball FighterZ, and female Byleth in Fire Emblem: Three Houses.

Biography
Tirado was born and raised in Orlando, Florida. She is of Puerto Rican descent. Growing up, Tirado was a fan of Disney films, especially The Little Mermaid and Beauty and the Beast; this inspired her to pursue a career in voice acting. Tirado graduated from college with a degree in music and worked as a vocalist for various albums, before switching to voice acting. On October 24, 2021 Jeannie Tirado married John Riding.

Filmography

Anime

Animation

Films

Video games

References

External links
 
 

Living people
Actresses from Orlando, Florida
American video game actresses
American voice actresses
Year of birth missing (living people)
21st-century American actresses